Public News is a Pakistani news channel launched on 24 June 2018 by a Pakistani media mogul Yousaf Baig Mirza.

The channel is owned and operated by Sports Star International Private Limited (Sports Star). It is an Urdu language Pakistani television news channel based in Lahore.

Talk Show Hosts 

 Saadia Afzaal
 Faisal Qureshi (Anchor)
 Farah Sadia
 Javed Iqbal (Journalist)
 Zamir Haider
 Alina Shigri
 Muhammad Akbar Bajwa
 Ramsha Kanwal
 Fawad Khurshid
 Sundas Khan
 Osama Tayyab

Programmes 

2 Tok
 Gar Tu Bura Na Mane
 Public Pulse
 Khabr Garam Hai
 Public Opinion
 Riyasat Aur Awam
 Public News Room
 Pakistan Ki Kahani
 Bayaniah
 Dialogue
 Insight with Fawad Khurshid
 Public with Khalil ur Rehman Qamar
 Good Morning Public (Morning Show)

News Analysts 

 Ehtsham-ul-Haq
 Zulfiqar Rahat
 Muhammad Ali Durrani (Former Politician)
 Haider Mehdi

See also 

 List of news channels in Pakistan

References 

http://publicnews.com/

External links

Television channels and stations established in 2018
Television stations in Lahore
Television networks in Pakistan
Television stations in Pakistan
2018 establishments in Pakistan